Man ļoti patīk jaunais vilnis is the second album by Latvian band Dzeltenie Pastnieki, released through magnitizdat in 1982, and 'officially' in 2003. The name of the album is Latvian for "I really like new wave". It was essentially recorded on the premises of the fishing kolkhoz "Uzvara" in Lielupe, Jūrmala.

Track listing
"Kāpēc tu mani negribi?" (Ingus Baušķenieks/Roberts Gobziņš/Mārtiņš Rutkis/Viesturs Slava/Zigmuns Streiķis)
"Bezcerīgā dziesma" (Baušķenieks/Gobziņš/Andris Kalniņš/Rutkis/Slava)
"Ai, sūnu zaļais (koši dzeltenais)" (Baušķenieks/Slava/Streiķis/Hardijs Lediņš)
"Ko labāk vēlies" (Baušķenieks/Slava/Streiķis)
"Nāc un piedod" (Baušķenieks/Rutkis/Slava/Streiķis)
"Mana vasara aiziet" (Baušķenieks/Streiķis)
"Trakais pastnieks" (Baušķenieks/Slava/Streiķis)
"Man ļoti patīk jaunais vilni" (Baušķenieks/Gobziņš/Slava)

Credits
Vocal on track 1 — Edīte Grīnberga
Percussion on track 8 — Ņikita
Front cover drawing and album title caption — Annija Jeromane
Cover photography — Gvido Kajons
Special thanks to Mārtiņš Saulespurēns and F. Tumanovs

Release history

References

External links 
 Man ļoti patīk jaunais vilnis at Discogs

1982 albums
Dzeltenie Pastnieki albums